Global Strategy Group, often known by its initials GSG or simply as Global, is an American public relations and research firm. Founded in New York City in 1995, GSG has been described in the New York Times as a “a well-known Democratic consulting firm” and a “ubiquitous presence in New York’s circles of power”.

GSG is noted for having advised former Governors of New York Eliot Spitzer and Andrew Cuomo, along with other notable New York politicians. Outside of New York, GSG has advised and polled on behalf of a litany of Democratic candidates running for both state and federal office. GSG also provides consultancy services in the private sector.

History and organization 
In 1995, GSG was founded by Jonathan Silvan (CEO), Jefrey Pollock (President), and Jeffrey Plaut (Partner) as a boutique polling firm. From its inception, GSG has conducted market research on behalf of its clientele, which include both political and corporate clients. In 2008, the firm's annual revenues were about $20 million, and it had 50 employees. In addition to its main offices in New York and Washington, D.C., GSG has offices in Chicago, Denver, Seattle; and Hartford, Connecticut.

In 2018, Pollock and GSG partner Nick Gourevitch founded the "Navigator Project" in conjunction with other political pollsters. The Navigator Project's stated aim is to "act as a consistent, flexible, responsive tool to inform policy debates". Additionally, GSG produces an annual Report on Business and Politics that assesses the relationship between the private sector and the political world.

Political campaigns

New York State 
Described in 2008 as an “ubiquitous presence in New York’s circles of power”, GSG has advised a litany of New York politicians, including former Governors Andrew Cuomo and Eliot Spitzer. In 2019, Melissa DeRosa, a top aide to then-Governor Cuomo, was criticized for suggesting edits to a poll conducted by GSG on behalf of “Jobs of New York”, described as a “so-called “super PAC” funded by billionaire New York City landlords” by the Times Union.

During Andrew Cuomo's gubernatorial tenure, GSG President Jefrey Pollock was described as a member of Cuomo's "inner circle". According to the New York Times, GSG President Jefrey Pollock was one of the key figures who advised Cuomo in the wake of the 2021 sexual harassment scandal that ultimately culminated in his resignation. GSG has also been active in New York municipal politics, and was most recently responsible for running the internal polling operation of 2021 mayoral candidate Scott Stringer.

GSG notably served as Representative Joe Crowley’s pollster in the 2018 Democratic primary for New York's 14th Congressional District. Though a GSG poll commissioned by Crowley’s campaign found him up 35% versus activist Alexandria Ocasio-Cortez, Crowley ultimately lost to Ocasio-Cortez by 15%. Other New York politicians advised by GSG include Senator Kirsten Gillibrand as well as Bill de Blasio during his 2009 Public Advocate campaign.

Outside of New York 
In 2007, the Washington Post noted that Democratic presidential candidate John Edwards employed Harrison Hickman, a principal at GSG, as his campaign pollster. The article described this hire as evidence of the “pitfalls of hiring consultants who conduct work for corporate clients and campaigns at the same time”, noting that:"...Edwards's own pollster, Harrison Hickman, is a principal at Global Strategy Group, which represents a range of corporate clients -- including oil and pharmaceutical companies -- that don't always mesh with the candidate's message."In the 2018 election cycle advised a number of winning Democratic campaigns, including six Democrats that flipped Republican-held congressional seats. Notable past clients including 2000 presidential candidate Al Gore, former Governor of Iowa Chet Culver, former Governor of Montana Brian Schweitzer. In 2016, GSG worked on behalf of Coloradans for Coloradans, an advocacy group that successfully campaigned against an initiative to establish a single-payer healthcare system in Colorado.

In 2020, GSG worked on behalf of Michael Bloomberg’s presidential campaign, and conducted polling that found that Bernie Sanders would damage the prospects of Democratic candidates if he was the party’s presidential nominee. GSG was hired by the Democratic Senatorial Campaign Committee (DSCC) to conduct polling on the 2020 Senate race in Georgia. GSG's research found that David Purdue, who went on to be defeated by Democratic Jon Ossoff, was seen unfavorably by a plurality of voters.

Corporate campaigns

Energy industry 
GSG has advised companies operating in the energy sector. GSG previously advised Chesapeake Energy, an oil company based in Oklahoma City. According to GSG’s website, the firm helped expand its natural gas exploration and extraction operations in Arkansas by “guiding them through a complicated political and public relations environment.” Other energy companies that have been advised by GSG include Moscow-based Lukoil Oil Company and General Electric.

Tech industry 
GSG has advised companies in the technology industry, including Microsoft, Google, and Facebook, and in the telecommunications sector, most notably Comcast. GSG was reportedly hired by rideshare companies Uber and Lyft to conduct research in support of their position that drivers should be classified as independent contractors, not employees.

Amazon 
In 2022, it was reported that GSG was hired by Amazon to help thwart the 2022 unionization drive at its JFK8 warehouse in Staten Island. Representatives from GSG reportedly sat-in on meetings where workers were shown anti-union presentations. According to CNBC, GSG monitored the social media accounts of union organizers, and distributed printed materials and videos "to discourage employees from voting to join a union."

After facing criticism for their involvement, GSG told The New Yorker that "We deeply regret being involved in any way.” GSG reportedly failed to file a LM20 disclosure form with the Department of Labor, required by the Labor Management Reporting and Disclosure Act (LMDRA), regarding these activities. Clients of GSG including the Iowa Democratic Party and the American Federation of Teachers have since cut their ties with the organization. On April 14, 2022, a spokesperson for the Service Employees International Union (SEIU) confirmed that the union would not employ GSG's services in the future.

Pharmaceutical industry 
Additionally, GSG has advised companies operating in the pharmaceutical sector, such as Purdue Pharma. GSG has also worked on behalf of GlaxoSmithKline and Pfizer.

2010 state pension inquiry 
In 2010, GSG was the subject of legal scrutiny as a result of the state investigation into Comptroller Alan Hevesi, who resigned in 2006 in a scandal. According to the New York Times, GSG allegedly “helped arrange deals between the city and state pension funds and InterMedia Partners, a prominent media investment fund, beginning in 2005” during Hevesi’s tenure. In the face of an investigation by the New York Attorney General’s office, GSG “paid $2 million for allegedly helping to steer money to private equity clients.” According to Politico:“The New York investigation has focused on political fixers like Morris and the Global Strategy Group, which allegedly sold entrée for fund managers to the more than $125 billion under the control of the New York State Comptroller.”GSG maintained that it had not violated any state laws, and stated in a press release that “There is no finding that we violated any law, and we are pleased to resolve this matter.”

Recognition and alumni 
As a result of the firm’s influence, GSG has been recognized in popular culture, most notably on the TV show The West Wing. In 2018, the firm’s “Lunch4Learning” campaign was given the 2018 Public Affairs Campaign of the Year award at the SABRE Awards.

Notable alumni of GSG include:
 Jen Psaki, White House Press Secretary (2021–present): Psaki joined GSG in 2011 as senior vice president and managing director at the firm’s Washington, D.C. office.
 Bill Burton, Deputy White House Press Secretary (2009-2011): Burton joined GSG’s Washington, D.C. office in 2013

References

External links 

 Global Strategy Group official website

Public opinion research companies in the United States
Companies established in 1995
Political consulting firms
Strategy consulting firms of the United States
Consulting firms established in 1995